Nora Ney (b. Iracema de Sousa Ferreira, Rio de Janeiro, March 20, 1922 - Rio de Janeiro, October 2003) was a Brazilian singer. She is also the most notable interpreter of the samba-canção music style and a pioneer of the Brazilian rock.

She first approached music by playing guitar by herself, and the father, in order to motivate, offered the instrument as a birthday gift.

Along with Maysa Matarazzo, Ângela Maria and Dolores Duran, was consecrated as the greatest samba-canção interpreter (emerged in the thirties). Often compared to bolero, for the featured exaltation and exploration of romantic love or the suffering of a non accomplished love affair was also called "elbow ache" (jealousy, heart ache). Samba-canção preceded the bossa nova (1957–1963) music style. But this one, inheritor of the American jazz, presented a more refined, gentle and soft melodies and interpretations, in detriment of those resented, melancholic ones.

She began her career in 1950 and in 1953 she was already one of the greatest divas of the Brazilian Radio Era, interpreting Dorival Caymmi, Noel Rosa, Ary Barroso. In 1952 she recorded her first LP for the record label Continental Records, entitled Menino da rua. Despite being a notable samba-canção interpreter, Nora Ney became one of the pioneers of the Brazilian rock by recording the first rock LP in the country: the Brazilian version of the Rock around the Clock, by Bill Haley & His Comets (soundtrack of Sementes da Violência movie), in October 1955. After only one week after the launch the song became a hit parade.

Among the curiosities of her public life stands out a second marriage with the singer Jorge Goulart; the daughter of that union, Vera Lúcia, became Miss Brasil in 1963. Due to the political involvement of Goulart within the Communist Party, she was forced into exile after the 1964 Brazilian coup d'état, which the military justified as being aimed at freeing the country against a communist threat.

Discography
  Menino grande/Quanto tempo faz (1952) Continental 78  
  Amor, meu grande amor/Ninguém me ama (1952) Continental 78  
  Luzes da ribaltaFelicidade (1953) Todamérica 78 
  De cigarro em cigarro/Onde anda você (1953) Continental 78 
  Índia/Preconceito (1953) Continental 78  
  Bar da noite/É tão gostoso seu moço (1953) Continental 78 
  Deixa-me (1953) Continental 78 
  Que saudade é esta/Canção de Portugal (1954) Continental 78 
  Que saudade é esta/Canção de Portugal (1954) Continental 78 
  Aves daninhas/O que foi que eu fiz (1954) Continental 78 
  Duas lacraias/Solidão (1954) Continental 78 
  Gosto, gosto de você/Não diga não (1955) Continental 78 
  Vou de tamanco/Se a saudade me apertar... (1955) Continental 78 
   Madrugada, três e cinco/Vamos falar de saudade (1955) Continental 78  
  Doce mãezinha/Ó meu papai (1955) Continental 78 
  O morro/Dois tristonhos (1955) Continental 78  
  Ronda das horas/Ciuminho grande (1955) Continental 78 
  Por que choras?/Meu lamento (1955) Continental 78 
  Quatro motivos/Sem ninguém (1955) Todamérica 78 
  Palavra de rei (1955) Todamérica 5593 
  Canta Nora Ney (1955) Continental LP 
  Eu ri de choar/Quando o amor vai embora (1956) Continental 78  
  Só louco/Não há mais segredo (1956) Continental 78 
  Rififi/Eu vivo tão só (1956) Continental 78 
  Se o negócio é sofrer/Não vou chorar (1957) Continental 78 
  Franqueza/Eu e Deus (1957) Continental 78  
  Saudade da Bahia/Chove lá fora (1957) Continental 78  
  São dois loucos/Eu sofro tanto (1957) Continental 78 
  Duas notas, nada mais/Quem é ela? (1958) Continental 78  
  Vai, mas vai mesmo/Castigo (1958) RCA Victor 78 
  Solidão/Pra falar com meus botões (1958) RCA Victor 78 
  Nora Ney (1958) RCA Victor LP 
  Sorria/Muito agradecida (1959) RCA Victor 78 
  Meu amor não me deixou/Canção do mal que faz bem (1959) RCA Victor 78 
  Razões/Duas almas (1959) RCA Victor 78 
  Você nasceu pro mal/Teleco teco nº 2 (1960) RCA Victor 78 
  Mentira/Saudade mentirosa (1960) RCA Victor 78 
  Ninguém me ama (1960) RCA Victor LP 
  Desencontro/Pra que voltar? (1961) Continental 78  
  João da Silva/E a vida continua... (1962) Mocambo 78 
  Mundo diferente/Hora final (1963) Mocambo 78 
  Mudando de conversa (1968) LP 
  Tire seu sorriso do caminho, que eu quero passar com a minha dor (1972) Som Livre LP 
  Jubileu de prata - Nora Ney e Jorge Goulart (1977) Som Livre LP 
  Meu cantar é tempestade de saudade (1987) 3M LP 
  As eternas cantoras do rádio (1991) CID CD 
  Nora Ney (1993) BMG CD 
  Mestres da MPB - Nora Ney (1994) CD 
  Acervo especial - Nora Ney (1994)  
  A música brasileira deste século por seus autores e intérpretes (2000) CD 
  ''Amor, meu grande

1922 births
2003 deaths
Brazilian contraltos
Brazilian women composers
English-language singers from Brazil
Musicians from Rio de Janeiro (city)
20th-century Brazilian women singers
20th-century Brazilian singers